Labinot Gashi (born 4 October 1989), known mononymously as Gashi (stylised as GASHI), is an Albanian-American rapper, singer and songwriter.

Biography 
Labinot Gashi was born in Libya, on October 4, 1989, to ethnic Albanian parents from Kosovo. He spent his childhood in several African and European countries before settling in Brooklyn, New York City, at the age of 10.

Struggling to pick up the English language, he turned to music to help ease his adjustment into society, and quickly became hooked to rap. Gashi graduated from New Utrecht High School and earned a football scholarship to play at a Division 2 school in Massachusetts (American International College). Although Gashi earned honors during his first year in college, he decided to drop out of college and concentrate more on music. He prepared his first mixtape and initially adopted the stage name The Kid Gashi to change it later to Gashi and eventually G4SHI and His stage name has officially changed back to GASHI.

Gashi won several music contests and he was the winner of "First Time Performances" of First Look Sessions in both 2010 and 2011. His debut project, the mixtape Last of a Rare Breed (2011) was hosted by Erkman, and featured tracks with Nipsey Hussle and French Montana. In 2012, G4shi founded his own group called Moxy. 2012 was a breakthrough year with the release of the hit "Rocket". In 2012, he also released "Beautiful World" under his crew Moxy. Future tracks, which included "Who Made Me" and "Laughing", were featured on Hot 97 after Peter Rosenberg co-signed him. G4shi also attracted the attention of fashion and clothing businesses. As of 2012 Gashi is the face and the representative of "Problem Child NYC" clothing line and did modelling for Problem Child line in New York.

In 2013, he released a follow-up mixtape I'll Be Right With You. A later project, entitled, 4Play featured his single "Room 4". In 2015, he released the track "Switch Up" and in 2016 "Day Ones" followed by "Turn Me Down" and "Disrespectful" both in 2017. The song "Disrespectful" was also featured in episode 4 of Showtime's The Chi.

The self-titled LP is his first studio release for RCA Records and was released in 2019. The album comprises 16 songs, featuring G-Eazy, French Montana, DJ Snake and Maxx Owa, among others. The project was led by a number of singles, including "Creep on Me" featuring French Montana, "Safety" featuring DJ Snake, and "My Year" with G-Eazy.

Discography

Studio albums 
2014: 4Play
2016: Stairs
2019: Gashi
2020: 1984
2022: Elevators

Mixtapes 
2011: Last of a Rare Breed

Extended plays 
2018: Long Story Short
2020: Cabin Fever
2020: Butterflies

Singles

As lead artist

As featured artist

Notes

References

External links 

1989 births
Living people
American people of Albanian descent
Kosovan emigrants to the United States
American hip hop musicians
Kosovan hip hop musicians
Songwriters from New York (state)
Albanian songwriters
American rappers
Albanian rappers
Kosovan rappers
21st-century Albanian rappers
21st-century American rappers
Rappers from New York (state)
RCA Records artists